Kanpur Nagar district, meaning Urban Kanpur District is one of the districts of the Uttar Pradesh state of India. It is a part of Kanpur division and its district headquarters is Kanpur. Kanpur was formerly spelled Cawnpore.

Notable People
Kavi Bhushan an Indian poet in the courts of the Bundeli king Chhatrasal and the Maratha king Shivaji. Bhushan resided in the Tikwapur village in Ghatampur tehsil of Kanpur district, Uttar Pradesh.

Demographics

According to the 2011 census Kanpur Nagar district has a population of 4,581,268, roughly equal to the nation of Costa Rica or the US state of Louisiana. This gives it a ranking of 32nd in India (out of a total of 640). Its population growth rate over the decade 2001-2011 was 9.72%. Kanpur Nagar has a sex ratio of 852 females for every 1000 males, and a literacy rate of 81.31%. Scheduled Castes made up 17.83% of the population.

At the time of the 2011 Census of India, 92.43% of the population in the district spoke Hindi (or a related language), 5.76% Urdu and 0.79% Punjabi as their first language.

See also
Anei (village)
Bithoor
Lakshmi Villa

References

External links 

 

Districts of Uttar Pradesh
 Kanpur Nagar district